Isidore Haiblum (May 23, 1935 – October 25, 2012) was an American author of science fiction, fantasy, and mystery novels.  He was nominated for the Mythopoeic Fantasy Award for his novel The Tsaddik of the Seven Wonders.

Biographic data 

Haiblum was born in Brooklyn, New York City on May 23, 1935. He died in New York City on October 25, 2012, of a stroke.

Novels

Siscoe And Block

 The Identity Plunderers (1984) 
 The Hand of Ganz (1985)

Weiss And Weiss

 New York Confidential (2005) 
 Murder In Gotham (2008)

Other Novels

 The Tsaddik of the Seven Wonders (1971) 
 The Return (1973) 
 Transfer to Yesterday (1973) 
 The Wilk Are Among Us (1975) 
 Interworld (1977)
 Binary Star 3 (1979) (with Ron Goulart)
 Nightmare Express (1979) 
 The Mutants Are Coming (1984) 
 Murder in Yiddish (1988) 
 Bad Neighbors (1990) 
 Out of Sync (1990) 
 Specterworld (1991) 
 Crystalworld (1992)

References

External links

1935 births
American male novelists
American science fiction writers
20th-century American novelists
2012 deaths
20th-century American male writers